The second AFL–NFL World Championship Game (known retroactively as Super Bowl II) was an American football game played on January 14, 1968, at the Orange Bowl in Miami, Florida. The National Football League (NFL)'s defending champion Green Bay Packers defeated  American Football League (AFL) champion Oakland Raiders by the score of 33–14. This game and the following year's are the only two Super Bowls played in the same stadium in consecutive seasons.

Coming into the game, much like during the first Super Bowl, many sports writers and fans believed that any team in the NFL was vastly superior to any club in the AFL. The Packers, the defending champions, posted a 9–4–1 record during the  NFL season before defeating the Los Angeles Rams 28–7 in the first round of the playoffs, then outlasted the Dallas Cowboys 21–17 in the frigid NFL Championship Game (popularly known as the Ice Bowl). The Raiders finished the regular season at 13–1, then defeated the Houston Oilers 40–7 in the AFL Championship Game.

As expected, Green Bay dominated Oakland throughout the majority of Super Bowl II. The Raiders could only score two touchdown passes from quarterback Daryle Lamonica. Meanwhile, Packers kicker Don Chandler made four field goals, including three in the first half, while cornerback Herb Adderley had a 60-yard interception return for a touchdown that put the game away. Green Bay quarterback Bart Starr was named the MVP for the second straight time, becoming the first back-to-back Super Bowl MVP for his 13 of 24 passes for 202 yards and one touchdown.

The Packers won their third consecutive World Championship, the second such occasion in NFL history (the 1929-31 Green Bay Packers did it first). The 1965-67 Packers became the first and only team to win three consecutive championship games, as there were no NFL playoff games from 1920-1932. No NFL team has accomplished this feat since.

Background
The NFL awarded Super Bowl II to Miami on May 25, 1967, at the owners meetings held in New York City. It marked the first of eleven Super Bowls in the Miami area (as of 2022), and the first of two consecutive (II and III). A total of five cities were considered to host the second edition: Miami, Los Angeles (Coliseum), Houston (Astrodome), Dallas (Cotton Bowl), and New Orleans (Tulane Stadium). After lackluster attendance for Super Bowl I at the Coliseum, Los Angeles was eliminated by the owners. The Miami Orange Bowl was selected for the game, based on weather, hotel accommodations, capacity, and the stadium's previous experience in hosting the Playoff Bowl. The local Orange Bowl committee had even once (unsuccessfully) lobbied to host the NFL Championship Game, which was not normally a neutral field contest. Furthermore, NFL Commissioner Pete Rozelle opined that it was "helpful to move the game around a little", and not play it in the same city every year. Playing the game in an AFL town also established a precedent for maintaining competitive balance between the two leagues. The city's contingent, led by mayor Robert King High, Joe Robbie, and others, would have just under eight months to prepare for the event.

Green Bay Packers

The Packers advanced to their second straight AFL-NFL World Championship Game, but had a much more difficult time than in the previous season. Both of their starting running backs from the previous year, future Pro Football Hall of Famers Paul Hornung and Jim Taylor, had left the team. Their replacements, Elijah Pitts and Jim Grabowski, both went down with season-ending injuries, forcing Green Bay coach Vince Lombardi to use second-year reserve running back Donny Anderson and rookie Travis Williams. Fullbacks Chuck Mercein and Ben Wilson, who were signed as free agents after being discarded by many other teams, were also used to help compensate for the loss of Hornung and Taylor. Meanwhile, the team's 33-year-old veteran quarterback Bart Starr had missed 4 games during the season with injuries, and finished the season with nearly twice as many interceptions (17) as touchdown passes (9).

The team's deep threat was provided by veteran receivers Carroll Dale, who recorded 35 receptions for 738 yards (a 21.1 average), and 5 touchdowns; and Pro Bowler Boyd Dowler, who had 54 catches for 846 yards and 4 touchdowns. The Packers still had the superb blocking of guard Jerry Kramer, Fred Thurston and Forrest Gregg.  Grabowski was the team's leading rusher with 466 yards, while Wilson had 453.  Anderson had 733 yards from scrimmage and 9 total touchdowns, while also gaining another 324 yards returning kicks.  On special teams, Williams returned 18 kickoffs for 749 yards and an NFL record 4 touchdowns, giving him a whopping 41.1 yards per return average. But overall the team ranked just 9th out of 16 NFL teams in scoring with 332 points.

The Packers defense, however, allowed only 209 points, the 3rd best in the NFL. Even this figure was misleading, since Green Bay had yielded only 131 points in the first 11 games (when they clinched their division), the lowest total in professional football. Three members of Green Bay's secondary, the strongest aspect of their defense, were named to the Pro Bowl: Willie Wood, Herb Adderley, and Bob Jeter. The Packers also had a superb defensive line led by Henry Jordan and Willie Davis. Behind them, the Packers linebacking core was led by Ray Nitschke.

The Packers won the NFL's Central Division with a 9–4–1 regular season record, clinching the division in the 11th week of the season. During the last three weeks, the Packers gave up an uncharacteristic total of 78 points, after having yielded only about a dozen points per game in their first 11 contests. In the playoffs, Green Bay returned to its dominant form, blowing away their first playoff opponent, the Los Angeles Rams, in the Western Conference Championship Game, 28–7. The next week, Green Bay then came from behind to defeat the Dallas Cowboys in the NFL championship game for the second year in a row, in one of the most famous games in NFL lore: The Ice Bowl.

Oakland Raiders

The Raiders, led by head coach John Rauch, had stormed to the top of the AFL with a 13–1 regular season record, the best record in AFL history (their only defeat was an October 7 loss to the New York Jets, 27–14), and went on to crush the Houston Oilers, 40–7, in the AFL Championship game. They had led all AFL and NFL teams in scoring with 468 points. And starting quarterback Daryle Lamonica had thrown for 3,228 yards and an AFL-best 30 touchdown passes.

The offensive line was anchored by center Jim Otto and rookie guard Gene Upshaw, along with AFL All-Stars Harry Schuh and Wayne Hawkins. Wide receiver Fred Biletnikoff led the team with 40 receptions for 876 yards, an average of 21.3 yards per catch. On the other side of the field, tight end Billy Cannon caught 32 passes for 629 yards and scored 10 touchdowns. In the backfield, the Raiders had three running backs, Clem Daniels, Hewritt Dixon, and Pete Banaszak, who carried the ball equally and combined for 1,510 yards and 10 touchdowns. On special teams, defensive back Rodger Bird led the AFL with 612 punt return yards and added another 148 yards returning kickoffs.

The main strength of the Raiders was their defense, nicknamed "The 11 Angry Men". The defensive line was anchored by AFL All-Stars Tom Keating and Ben Davidson, a former Packer who played on Green Bay's 1961 championship team. Davidson was an extremely effective pass rusher who had demonstrated his aggressiveness in a regular season game against the New York Jets by breaking the jaw of Jets quarterback Joe Namath while sacking him. Behind them, All AFL linebacker Dan Conners excelled at blitzing and pass coverage, recording 3 interceptions. The Raiders also had two All AFL defensive backs: Willie Brown, who led the team with 7 interceptions, and Kent McCloughan, who had 2 interceptions. Safety Warren Powers recorded 6 interceptions, returning them for 154 yards and 2 touchdowns.

Super Bowl pregame news and notes
Despite Oakland's accomplishments, and expert consensus that this was the weakest of all the Packer NFL championship teams, Green Bay was a 14-point favorite to win the Super Bowl. Like the previous year, most fans and sports writers believed that the top NFL teams were superior to the best AFL teams.

Thus, most of the drama and discussions surrounding the game focused not on which team would win, but on the rumors that Lombardi might retire from coaching after the game. The game also proved to be the final one for Packers wide receiver Max McGee, one of the heroes of Super Bowl I, and place kicker Don Chandler.

This was the first Super Bowl to use the "tuning fork" or "slingshot" goalposts (with one supporting post instead of two) invented by Jim Trimble and Joel Rottman; they had made their debut at the start of the season for both the AFL and NFL, and first appeared at the pro level in Canada.

Media coverage

Television
The game was televised in the United States by CBS, with Ray Scott handling the play-by-play duties and color commentators Pat Summerall and Jack Kemp in the broadcast booth. Kemp was the first Super Bowl commentator who was still an active player (with Buffalo of the AFL) at the time of the broadcast. The CBS telecast of this game is considered lost; all that survives are in-game photos, most of which were shown in the January 8, 1969 edition of Sports Illustrated. Not even NFL Films, the league's official filmmaker, has a copy of the full game available; however, they do have game footage that they used for their game highlight film.

Unlike the previous year's game, Super Bowl II was televised live on only one network, which has been the case for all subsequent Super Bowl games. While the Orange Bowl was sold out for the game, the NFL's unconditional blackout rules in place then prevented the live telecast from being shown in the Miami area.

During the latter part of the second quarter, and again for three minutes of halftime, almost 80 percent of the country (with the exceptions of New York City, Cleveland, Philadelphia and much of the Northeast) lost the video feed of the CBS broadcast. CBS, who had paid $2.5 million for broadcast rights, blamed the glitch on a breakdown in AT&T cable lines.

39.12 million people in the US watched the game on television, resulting in a rating of 36.8 and a market share of 68. The overnight Arbitron rating was 43.

Ceremonies and entertainment
The pregame ceremonies featured two giant figures, one dressed as a Packers player and the other dressed as a Raiders player. They appeared on opposite ends of the field and then faced each other near the 50-yard line.

The Grambling College Tiger Marching Band performed the national anthem as well as during the halftime show. The same band was part of the halftime show of Super Bowl I the previous year.

This was the first Super Bowl to use the slingshot-style goalposts which were introduced in both the NFL and the AFL this season.

Game summary

First quarter
The game kicked off at 3:05 p.m. EST. On Oakland's first offensive play, Ray Nitschke shot through a gap and literally upended fullback Hewritt Dixon in what was one of Nitschke's signature plays of his entire career. The hit was so vicious, it prompted Jerry Green, a Detroit News columnist sitting in the press box with fellow journalists, to say in a deadpan, that the game was over. The Packers opened up the scoring with Don Chandler's 39-yard field goal after marching 34 yards on their first drive of the game. Meanwhile, the Raiders were forced to punt on their first two possessions.

Second quarter
The Packers then started their second possession at their own 3-yard line, and in the opening minutes of the second quarter, they drove 84 yards to the Raiders 13-yard line. However, they once again had to settle for a Chandler field goal to take a 6–0 lead. Later in the period, the Packers took the ball on their own 38-yard line following an Oakland punt. Raider cornerback Kent McCloughan jammed Packer split end Boyd Dowler at the line of scrimmage but then allowed him to head downfield, thinking that a safety would pick him up. However, McCloughan and left safety Howie Williams were both influenced by the Packer backs who were executing a "flood" pattern, with halfback Travis Williams and fullback Ben Wilson running pass routes to the same side as Dowler. Dowler ran a quick post and was wide open down the middle. He grabbed Starr's pass well behind middle linebacker Dan Conners, and right safety Rodger Bird could not get over quickly enough.  Dowler outran the defense to score on a 62-yard touchdown reception, increasing the Packer lead to 13–0.

After being completely dominated until this point, the Raiders offense finally struck back their next possession, advancing 79 yards in 9 plays, and scoring on a 23-yard touchdown pass from Daryle Lamonica to receiver Bill Miller. The score seemed to fire up the Raiders' defense, and they forced the Packers to punt on their next drive. Raiders returner Rodger Bird gave them great field position with a 12-yard return to Green Bay's 40-yard line, but Oakland could only gain 1 yard with their next 3 plays and came up empty when George Blanda's 47-yard field goal attempt fell short of the goal posts. Oakland's defense again forced Green Bay to punt after 3 plays on the ensuing drive, but this time after calling for a fair catch, Bird fumbled punter Donny Anderson's twisting, left footed kick, and Green Bay's Dick Capp recovered the ball. After 2 incomplete passes, Starr threw a 9-yard completion to Dowler (despite a heavy rush from Ike Lassiter) to set up Chandler's third field goal from the 43 as time expired in the first half, giving the Packers a 16–7 lead.

At halftime, Packers guard Jerry Kramer said to his teammates (referring to Lombardi), "Let's play the last 30 minutes for the old man."

Third quarter
Any chance the Raiders might have had to make a comeback seemed to completely vanish in the second half. The Packers had the ball three times in the third quarter, and held it for all but two and a half minutes. On the Packers second drive of the half starting at their own 17, Ben Wilson ripped up the middle for 14 yards on a draw play.  Anderson picked up 8 yards on a sweep, and Wilson carried to within inches of the first down.  Starr then pulled one of his favorite plays on third down and short yardage, faking to Wilson and completing a 35-yard pass to wide receiver Max McGee who had slipped past three Raiders at the line of scrimmage.  This was McGee's only reception of the game, and the final one of his career.  Starr then hit Carroll Dale on a sideline route at the Oakland 13.  Starr overthrew Donny Anderson wide open in the end zone, but on the next play he rolled out to the right and threw back to Anderson who was tackled on the two by linebacker Gus Otto.  The next play was a broken play, as Anderson thought he saw daylight to the right but ran into Starr. The Packers were not rattled, and the line and fullback Ben Wilson wiped out the Raiders on Anderson's 2-yard touchdown run over right tackle, making the score 23–7.

Packer guard Jerry Kramer must have taken to heart his plea to play the second half for Coach Lombardi.  On this drive, game films show him blowing Dan Conners out of Wilson's path on the draw play, then flattening Conners again on Anderson's scoring run.

Again the Green Bay defense forced Oakland to go three-and-out, and the Raiders punted.  The Packers drove from their own 39 to the Raider 24 and increased their lead to 26–7 as Chandler kicked his fourth field goal (which hit the crossbar from 31 yards out and bounced over).

Fourth quarter
Early in the fourth quarter, Starr was knocked out of the game when he jammed the thumb on his throwing hand on a sack by Davidson. (Starr was replaced by Zeke Bratkowski, who was then sacked on his only pass attempt.) But later in the period, the Packers put the game completely out of reach when Herb Adderley intercepted a pass intended for Fred Biletnikoff and returned it 60 yards for a touchdown, making the score 33–7. Adderley laid back as the Raider end ran a curl route, then dashed in front of him to snare the ball and scored with the help of a crushing downfield block by tackle Ron Kostelnik.

Oakland did manage to score on their next drive after the turnover with a second 23-yard touchdown pass from Lamonica to Miller, set up by Pete Banaszak's 41-yard reception on the previous play. But all the Raiders' second touchdown did was make the final score look remotely more respectable, 33–14.

At the end of the game, coach Lombardi was carried off the field by his victorious Packers in one of the more memorable images of early Super Bowl history. It was in fact Lombardi's last game as Packer coach and his ninth consecutive playoff victory.

Oakland's Bill Miller was the top receiver of the game with 5 receptions for 84 yards and 2 touchdowns. Green Bay fullback Ben Wilson was the leading rusher of the game with 62 yards despite missing most of the fourth quarter while looking for a lost contact lens on the sidelines. Don Chandler ended his Packer career in style with 4 field goals. Lamonica, the game's leading passer, finished with 15 out of 34 pass completions for 208 yards, 2 touchdowns, and 1 interception. Bart Starr completed 13 of 24 (with a couple of dropped passes) for 202 yards and one touchdown; his passer rating for the game was 96.2 to Lamonica's 71.7. The Packers outgained the Raiders in rushing yardage 160 to 107, led in time of possession by 35:54 to 24:06, had no turnovers, and only one penalty. Packer guard Jerry Kramer later recalled the mental mistakes his team made in the game, which only highlights the impossibly high standards held by Lombardi's team. As previously mentioned,  this was Lombardi's last game as Green Bay head coach and this was also the final game for Green Bay Packer players Max McGee, Fuzzy Thurston, and Don Chandler.

Box score

Final statistics
Sources:The NFL's Official Encyclopedic History of Professional Football, (1973), p. 139, Macmillan Publishing Co. New York, NY, LCCN 73-3862, NFL.com Super Bowl II, Super Bowl II Play Finder GB, Super Bowl II Play Finder Oak

Statistical comparison

Individual statistics

1Completions/attempts
2Carries
3Long gain
4Receptions
5Times targeted

Records set
The following records were set or tied in Super Bowl II, according to the official NFL.com boxscore and the ProFootball reference.com game summary. Some records have to meet NFL minimum number of attempts to be recognized. The minimums are shown (in parenthesis).  

 † This category includes rushing, receiving, interception returns, punt returns, kickoff returns, and fumble returns.
 ‡ Sacks an official statistic since Super Bowl XVII by the NFL. Sacks are listed as "Tackled Attempting to Pass" in the official NFL box score for Super Bowl II.

Turnovers are defined as the number of times losing the ball on interceptions and fumbles.

Starting lineups

Source:

Officials
 Referee: Jack Vest (AFL)
 Umpire: Ralph Morcroft (NFL)
 Head Linesman: Tony Veteri (AFL)
 Line Judge: Bruce Alford (NFL)
 Back Judge: Stan Javie (NFL)
 Field Judge: Bob Baur (AFL)

Alternates
Referee Ben Dreith (AFL)

Note: A seven-official system was not used until 1978

See also
 1967 NFL season
 NFL playoffs, 1967
 NFL Championship Game, 1967
 American Football League playoffs

References

External links
 Super Bowl official website
 
 
 
 
 https://www.pro-football-reference.com – Large online database of NFL data and statistics
 Super Bowl play-by-plays from USA Today (Last accessed September 28, 2005)
 All-Time Super Bowl Odds from The Sports Network (Last accessed October 16, 2005)

Bibliography
 Gruver, Edward (2002). Nitschke. Lanham, MD.:Taylor Trade Publishing. 

1968 in American football
Super Bowl
Green Bay Packers postseason
Oakland Raiders postseason
1967 National Football League season
1967 American Football League season
1968 in sports in Florida
American football in Miami
Sports competitions in Miami
January 1968 sports events in the United States
1960s in Miami